Dieudonné Takou (born 1960) is a Cameroonian weightlifter. He competed in the men's super heavyweight event at the 1988 Summer Olympics.

References

1960 births
Living people
Cameroonian male weightlifters
Olympic weightlifters of Cameroon
Weightlifters at the 1988 Summer Olympics
Place of birth missing (living people)
20th-century Cameroonian people